The Senior men's race at the 2019 IAAF World Cross Country Championships was held at the Aarhus in Denmark, on March 30, 2019. Joshua Cheptegei from Uganda won the gold medal by four seconds from fellow countryman Jacob Kiplimo while Kenyan runner, Geoffrey Kamworor finished third.

Race results

Senior men's race (10 km)

Individual

Teams

See also
 2019 IAAF World Cross Country Championships – Junior men's race
 2019 IAAF World Cross Country Championships – Senior women's race
 2019 IAAF World Cross Country Championships – Junior women's race
 2019 IAAF World Cross Country Championships – Mixed relay

References

Senior men's race at the World Athletics Cross Country Championships
2019 IAAF World Cross Country Championships